Daniel Rae Costello (17 June 1961 – 22 July 2019) was a Fijian-born musician based in Samoa. He died on 22 July 2019 of cancer.

Personal life
Born in Suva, Fiji, Costello, along with his brother, attended high school in Whangārei, New Zealand.   His mother, Jessie Rae was of Samoan, Rotuman and Scottish descent whereas his father, Dan Costello, was Irish; both were born in Fiji. He was brought up in Tavua. His father owned a cattle ranch. He moved with his family to Lautoka when he was 5 and lived there for the rest of his life. He and his younger brother Vince started a band called The Fleet Swingers when he was in Grade 7; his brother was the lead singer. 

He completed his last year of school in Suva, Fiji, at Marist Brothers High School, where he won the school's talent contest for that year.
He was later asked to perform at Suva Grammar School as a guest artist, and there met his future wife, Corrina.

After winning a few talent contests, he joined a small group called The Beachcomber Boys who performed daily at the Beachcomber Island Resort.

In 2014 he moved permanently to Samoa.

Music
In 1979 he recorded his first solo-album called "Tropical Sunset" which wasn't much of a success but three years later, his album, Lania which was a huge success in Fiji and around the Pacific. After his mother died in 1985, he changed his name to Daniel Rae Costello. He moved to Australia a few years later because of the 1987 Coup where he wrote two songs, Samba and Take me to the Island and returned to Fiji and started his own Studio and Production Suite called "Tango Sound Productions" and recorded his first big hit album, Samba. Since 1978, he has recorded 30 albums to date in the last 30 years. He was an accomplished songwriter, composer, arranger, audio engineer, vocalist, musician and producer in the Pacific region. He recently recorded an album with Toni Willé from the Dutch group Pussycat, called Let The World Sing. The first single, originally a hit for Pussycat Georgie gained numerous airplays on Fiji radio.

At the 2020 Pacific Music Awards he was posthumously awarded a lifetime achievement award.

Discography

Albums
1979 Tropical Sunset
1982 Lania
1993 Jungle Walk (WMR)
1994 Rockin Island Hits
2004 The Beach Party
2007 Moondance
2008 Let The World Sing
Footprints In The Sand
Wind Of Change
Calypso Man
My Island Home Rotuma

References

External links

Music on Amazon.com
 Daniel Rae Costello on Last.fm.  Retrieved:  7 July 2015
 Daniel Rae Costello on ReverbNation.  Retrieved:  7 July 2015
 Website

People from Lautoka
1961 births
2019 deaths
Fijian musicians
Fijian people of Rotuman descent
Samoan musicians
People educated at Marist Brothers High School, Fiji
People from Suva
Fijian people of Samoan descent
Fijian people of Scottish descent
Fijian people of Irish descent
Fijian emigrants to Samoa